Animal ДжаZ ("ДжаZ" can be transliterated as "jazz", although "Джаз" is the usual Russian spelling) is a Saint Petersburg-based band playing alternative rock and pop rock. They were formed in 2000. As of 2020, they have released 15 studio albums, including five acoustic albums.

Overview
Animal Jazz formed in Saint Petersburg on 22 December 2000. They have been nominated twice for the Fuzz Magazine Awards and played at both ceremonies: in 2003 as "Best New Band" and in 2004 as "Best Live Band". In August 2006, Animal Jazz headlined the alternative stage of the biggest Russian open-air rock festival, Nashestvie. The band was nominated in a few categories for RAMP 2008 (Rock Alternative Music Prize) and won in the categories "Best song of the year" and "Soundtrack of the year".

Animal Jazz have opened for:
 Rollins Band (Moscow, 24 January 2002, and St. Petersburg, 25 January 2002)
 Garbage (St. Petersburg, 2 July 2002)
 Clawfinger (Moscow, 26 September 2003)
 The Rasmus (St. Petersburg, 15 October 2004)
 Linkin Park (St. Petersburg, 1 June 2014, and Moscow, 2 June 2014)

Band members
Current
 Alexander "Mihalych" Krasovitski – vocals
 Igor Buligin – bass
 Evgenyi "Johnson" Ryahovski – guitar
 Sergey Kivin – drums
 Alexander Zarankin – keyboards

Past
 Sergey Egorov (2000–2004) – drums
 Boris Golodec (2000–2004) – keyboards
 Stanislav Gavrilov (2004–2005) – keyboards
 Andey Kazachenko (2005–2007) – keyboards
 Yan Lemskiy (2004–2008) – drums

Discography
Electric albums
 Animalизм  (Animalism) (2002)
 Стереолюбовь  (Stereolove) (2004)
 Как Люди  (Like People) (2004)
 Шаг Вдох  (Step Inhale) (2007)
 Эгоист  (Egoist) (2009
 Animal ДжаZ  (Animal Jazz) (2011)
 Фаза быстрого сна (REM Sleep Phase) (2013)
 Хранитель весны (Keeper of Spring) (2015)
 Счастье (Happiness) (2018)
 Время любить  (Time to Love) (2019)

Acoustic albums
 Unplugged (2005)
 Unplugged II: раритеты  (Unplugged II: Rarities) (2006)
 1:0 в пользу осени  (1:0 in Favor of Autumn) (2007)
 AZXV: Акустика (AZXV: Acoustics) (2016)
 Acoustic with Detsl (2018)

Soundtracks
 Graffiti (2006)

Compilations
 The Best (2004)
 Single Collection (2005)
 AZXV (2015)
 Шаг Вдох. Трибьют (Step Inhale. Tribute) (2017)

External links

 
 Youtube

Musical groups from Saint Petersburg
Russian rock music groups
Russian alternative rock groups